Lyulin Metro Station is a station on the Sofia Metro in Bulgaria. It opened on 28 January 1998. The station is serving the Lyulin housing estate.

Interchange with other public transport
 Tramway service: 8
 City Bus service: 108, 111
 Suburban Bus service: 42

External links
 Sofia Metropolitan (Official site)
 Unofficial site
 360 degree panorama from outside the station (west end)

Sofia Metro stations
Railway stations opened in 1998
1998 establishments in Bulgaria